Megasonic cleaning is a type of acoustic cleaning, related to ultrasonic cleaning. It is a gentler cleaning mechanism, less likely to cause damage, and is used in wafer, medical implant, and industrial part cleaning.

Similar to ultrasonic cleaning, megasonics utilizes a transducer that usually sits atop a piezoelectric substrate. The transducer creates an acoustic field at a much higher frequency (typically 0.8–2 MHz) compared to ultrasonic cleaning (20-200 kHz). As a result, the cavitation that occurs is gentler and on a much smaller scale. Megasonics are currently used mainly in the electronics industry for preparation of silicon wafers.

Megasonics cleaning compared to ultrasonic cleaning

The difference between ultrasonic cleaning and megasonics cleaning lies in the frequency that is used to generate the acoustic waves. Ultrasonic cleaning uses lower frequencies, and produces random cavitation. Megasonics cleaning uses higher frequencies, and produces controlled cavitation.

An important distinction between the two methods is that the cavitation effects in a megasonic bath are much less damaging than those found with ultrasonic frequencies. This significantly reduces or eliminates cavitation erosion and the likelihood of surface damage to the product being cleaned. Parts that would be damaged by ultrasonic frequencies or cavitation effects can often be cleaned without damage in a megasonic bath using the same solution.

With ultrasonics, cavitation occurs throughout the tank, and all sides of submerged parts are cleaned. With megasonics, the acoustic wave is found only in a line of sight from the transducer surface. For this reason, megasonic transducers are typically built using arrays of square or rectangular piezo devices bonded to a substrate, and spaced as close together as possible. Semiconductor wafers are typically cleaned in carriers holding the substrates perpendicular to the transducer so that both front and back surfaces can be cleaned. Special carriers are sometimes used to reduce any obstructions that may prevent parts of the wafer surface from being cleaned.

Today, for single wafer cleaning there are not only megasonic tanks and transducer plates, but also different configurations. For example, so called megasonic single- or dual- nozzle systems, or single-wafer transducers. In these configurations the single wafer is turning on a spinning tool and the megasonics is applied from above by the nozzle (liquid stream) or by the face-to-face transducer (partial area excited by megasound).

See also 

 Parts cleaning
 Ultrasonic cavitation device

References 

Ultrasound
Cleaning methods